Andrea Alberti (born 15 January 1985 in Desenzano del Garda) is a professional Italian football player who plays for Orceana.

Biography
He played 3 games in Serie A in the 2002/03 season for Brescia Calcio.

He represented Italy at the 2004 UEFA European Under-19 Football Championship.

Italian football scandal
On 18 June 2012, Alberti was banned 3-year and 6-month due to 2011–12 Italian football scandal. His appeal was accepted by Tribunale Nazionale di Arbitrato per lo Sport (TNAS) of CONI in December 2012, which Alberti's ban was canceled.

Mantova
On 7 June 2013 Alberti was signed by Mantova F.C. He was released on 5 December.

References

External links
 
 Andrea Alberti at TuttoCampo.it 

1985 births
Living people
Italian footballers
Italy youth international footballers
Serie A players
Serie B players
Brescia Calcio players
A.C. Cesena players
A.S. Sambenedettese players
S.S. Virtus Lanciano 1924 players
A.C. Monza players
A.C. Prato players
Mantova 1911 players
Association football forwards